Geoffrey Manton Stults (born December 15, 1977) is an American actor. His first regular roles on television included 7th Heaven, October Road, and Happy Town. He went on to star as Major Walter Sherman on The Finder, Sgt. Pete Hill on Enlisted, and Marco Strzalkowski on Guilty Party. He also played the recurring role of Mitch on seasons  1-3 of the hit Netflix series Grace and Frankie. His film roles include Wedding Crashers, The Break-Up, She's Out of My League, Only the Brave, and 12 Strong. He will next be seen as Jake opposite Jennifer Garner in The Last Thing He Told Me.

Early life
Stults was born in Detroit, Michigan and raised in Green Mountain Falls, Colorado. His brother is actor George Stults. He graduated from Manitou Springs High School. He moved to Los Angeles, and began to perform in the college theater productions while attending Whittier College, in Whittier, California where he also played football.

Career

Football career
He played professional American Football in the Austrian Football League as a wide receiver for the Klosterneuburg Mercenaries (now known as the Danube Dragons).

Acting career
Stults started his acting career at the age of seven by doing commercials alongside his brother George. He appeared on Everybody Loves Raymond as a mailman in the episode "What's with Robert?" He landed his first major role in 2002 as Ben Kinkirk, a fireman at the department in which Mary Camden was training and Mary's soon-to-be new love interest, on the show 7th Heaven. The role of Ben's brother, Kevin Kinkirk, was portrayed by George Stults, his real life brother. Stults portrayed Eddie Latekka for two seasons on the popular ABC drama series October Road.

His first major film role came in 2004, when he played the male lead in the female action-comedy D.E.B.S., where he met his future co-star on The Finder, Michael Clarke Duncan. Since then, Stults has had small but memorable roles in Wedding Crashers and The Break-Up, as well as larger roles in The Express: The Ernie Davis Story, She's Out Of My League and L!fe Happens.

In 2010, Stults played Dan (an amalgamation of the book's popular characters El Bingeroso/PWJ/GoldenBoy) in the film adaptation of I Hope They Serve Beer In Hell. He starred in the short-lived ABC television series Happy Town and appeared on How I Met Your Mother.

At the 2011 network upfronts, Fox announced that it picked up the Bones spin-off, The Finder, starring Stults in the lead role of Walter Sherman (a.k.a. The Finder), an Iraq war veteran who, after a brain injury from an exploding IED, was left with the extraordinary skill of finding anybody or anything. The show co-starred Duncan, Mercedes Masohn, and Maddie Hasson. It premiered January 12, 2012, as a mid-season replacement for Bones. The show was canceled and the final episode aired on May 11, 2012.

Stults later guest starred in Stargirl as Courtney Whitmore's father Sam Kurtis.

Personal life
In June 2005, Stults was reported to be in a relationship with actress and former WWE Diva Stacy Keibler. The pair appeared together on MTV's Punk'd, with Keibler as the recipient of the prank. Keibler and Stults are part-owners of the Hollywood Fame, a 2006 expansion franchise of the American Basketball Association. Stults and Keibler split in 2010.

Filmography

Film

Television

References

External links

 
 
 

1977 births
21st-century American male actors
Male actors from Colorado
American male film actors
American male television actors
Living people
Whittier College alumni
People from Green Mountain Falls, Colorado
American expatriate sportspeople in Austria
American expatriate players of American football